Guy Spigelman is an Israel Defense Forces spokesperson, originally from Sydney, Australia. Because of his native English skills, he is often seen in the English-language media (notably on CNN, Fox News and BBC). He is also active within Israeli politics, serving as an advisor to Amir Peretz, and running for the Knesset (Israeli parliament) with the Ha'avoda (Labour) party in 2006.

Spigelman is a graduate and former federal mazkir of Habonim Dror Australia.

Israeli military personnel
Australian emigrants to Israel
Australian Jews
Israeli Jews
People from Sydney
Living people
Year of birth missing (living people)